Virginia Fábregas García (17 December 1871 – 17 November 1950) was a Mexican film and stage actress active in the early 20th-Century. She appeared in films between 1931 and 1945.

Personal life
Virginia Fábregas García was born on 17 December 1871 Oacalco, Yautepec, Morelos, Mexico. Her father was Ricardo Fábregas, originally from Spain, and her mother was Úrsula García. After her mother's death, she spent part of her childhood on the hacienda Apanquetzalco in Morelos, where the owner built a small theater for her. She attended the Normal school in Mexico City, graduating in 1896. She married actor and director Francisco Cardona on July 4, 1902. They had a daughter and two sons, including Manuel Sánchez-Navarro, who married actress Fanny Schiller. Virginia Fábregas died at the age of 79 in Mexico City, and on 18 November 1950 she was buried in the Rotonda de las Personas Ilustres (Rotunda of Illustrious Persons) in that city.

Acting career
In 1891 Fábregas García participated in a benefit in the Teatro Nacional, attracting the attention of the actor Leopoldo Burón, who hired her for his theater company. Her professional debut was on 30 April 1892, at the age of 21, appearing in Divorciémonos by Victoriano Sardou. She soon became popular not only in Mexico but also in Latin America and Europe, and she became known as the "Mexican Sarah Bernhardt". Mexican President Porfirio Díaz was in the audience when she inaugurated her theater in Mexico City.

Filmography

See also
 List of people from Morelos, Mexico

References

External links

 Bound for Glory: Virginia Fabregas, a life dedicated to the theater (in Spanish)

1871 births
1950 deaths
20th-century Mexican actresses
Actresses from Morelos
Mexican film actresses
Mexican stage actresses
Mexican people of Spanish descent